Graduate is a 2011 Indian Telugu language romance film written and directed by Prasad Rayala. It stars debutants Akshay and Rithika Sood in the lead roles alongside Tashu Kaushik. Murali has handled the camera and Sandeep has composed the music. This film has been released in the first week of January 2011.

Plot
This film is completely youth centric with romance as the backdrop.

Cast
 Akshay as Chakri
 Tashu Kaushik as Manisha
 Rithika Sood as Rithika
 Manoj Chandra
 Ranjeet Somi
 Chandramohan as Manisha's father
Brahmanandam as Bhikshapati

Soundtrack
The music of the film is composed by Sandeep.

References

2011 films
2010s Telugu-language films